The Ministry of Élie Decazes was formed on 19 November 1819 after the dismissal of the Ministry of Jean-Joseph Dessolles by King Louis XVIII of France. It was dissolved on 17 February 1820 and replaced on 20 February 1820 by the Second ministry of Armand-Emmanuel du Plessis de Richelieu.

Ministers
The ministers were:

References

Sources

French governments
1819 establishments in France
1820 disestablishments in France
Cabinets established in 1819
Cabinets disestablished in 1820